María Josefina Herrando Puig (born April 26, 1930) is a Uruguayan politician and former First Lady of Uruguay from 1972 until 1976. She is the widow of Juan María Bordaberry, the constitutionally elected president from 1972 to 1973 and de facto presidential dictator from 1973 to 1976 as the head of the Civic-military dictatorship of Uruguay. Herrando, who is nicknamed "China", is the country's oldest living former first lady.

Biography
Herrán and her late husband, Bordaberry, had nine children, including Pedro Bordaberry, a former Senator from 2015 to 2020 and Minister of Tourism from 2003 to 2005 in the cabinet of Jorge Batlle.

In 1973, as the country's first lady, Herrando founded the Social Coordination Volunteer Corps (VCS), a non-profit which continues to develop programs for patients in hospitals, as well as in the community. VCS is made up of approximately 150 volunteers. Herrando has served as the organization's president. 

Herrán's husband, Juan María Bordaberry, was sentenced to 30 years in prison for violations of the constitution and human rights abuses. He died under house arrest in July 2011.

References

Living people
1930 births
First Ladies of Uruguay
Colorado Party (Uruguay) politicians
People from Montevideo